Dinghu District is a district of Zhaoqing, Guangdong province, People's Republic of China.

Administrative divisions

See also
 Dinghu Mountain
 Qingyun Temple (Guangdong)

References

Zhaoqing
County-level divisions of Guangdong